Stars Over Arizona is a 1937 American Western film directed by Robert North Bradbury and written by Robert Emmett Tansey. The film stars Jack Randall, Kathleen Eliot, Horace Murphy, Warner Richmond, Tom Herbert and Chick Hannan. The film was released on September 22, 1937, by Monogram Pictures.

Plot

Cast           
Jack Randall as Jack Dawson
Kathleen Eliot as Jane Manning
Horace Murphy as Smokey
Warner Richmond as Ace Carter
Tom Herbert as Doc
Chick Hannan as Yucca Bill Thompson
Hal Price as Hashknife Holdin
Ernie Adams as Jimmy the Weasel
Charles Romas as Chuckawalla Joe
Shuma Shermatova as Zona
Jack Rockwell as Sheriff
Forrest Taylor as Saunders
Bob McKenzie as Judge
Tex Palmer as Henchman

References

External links
 

1937 films
1930s English-language films
American Western (genre) films
1937 Western (genre) films
Monogram Pictures films
Films directed by Robert N. Bradbury
American black-and-white films
1930s American films